The Dallas Stars are an American professional ice hockey team based in Dallas. They play in the Central Division of the Western Conference in the National Hockey League (NHL). The team joined the NHL in 1967 as an expansion team as the Minnesota North Stars, but moved to Dallas in 1993. The Stars won their first Stanley Cup championship in 1999. Having first played at the Reunion Arena, the Stars have played their home games at the American Airlines Center since 2001. The most recent head coach was Rick Bowness who served from the 2019–20 season until the end of the 2021–22 season.

There have been eight head coaches for the Stars' team. The team's first head coach was Bob Gainey, who coached for four seasons. In the middle of the 1995–96 season, Gainey, who was then also the general manager for the Stars, fired himself as head coach and hired Ken Hitchcock to take over. Hitchcock is the team's all-time leader for the most regular-season games coached (585), the most regular-season game wins (319), the most regular-season points (718), the most playoff games coached (80), and the most playoff-game wins (47). Hitchcock is the only Stars coach to have won the Presidents' Trophy, winning it in 1997–98 and 1998–99, the Clarence S. Campbell Bowl, winning it in 1998–99 and 1999–2000, and the Stanley Cup, winning it in the 1999 Stanley Cup Finals against the Buffalo Sabres. Hitchcock returned for one more season with the Stars in 2017–18. None of the Stars coaches have been elected into the Hockey Hall of Fame as a builder.

Key

Coaches
Note: Statistics are correct through the 2021–22 season.

Notes
 A running total of the number of coaches of the Stars. Thus, any coach who has two or more separate terms as head coach is only counted once.
 Before the 2005–06 season, the NHL instituted a penalty shootout for regular season games that remained tied after a five-minute overtime period, which prevented ties.
Each year is linked to an article about that particular NHL season.

References
General

Specific

     
head coaches
Dallas Stars head coaches